The 2022–23 season is the 76th in the history of FC Liefering and their 10th consecutive season in the second division. The club are participating in the Austrian Football Second League.

Players

First team squad

Transfers

Pre-season and friendlies

Competitions

Overall record

Austrian Football Second League

League table

Results summary

Results by round

Matches 
The league fixtures were announced on 24 June 2022.

References

Liefering